"The Old Bog Road" is an Irish song written as a poem by Teresa Brayton, from Kilbrook, County Kildare, and set to music by Madeline King O'Farrelly. The road in question is located near the author's residence in Ferrans (alternative spelling "Ferns") Lock.

Recordings
The song has been recorded by the following artists, among others:

Ruthie Morrissey
Mick Moloney
Willie Brady
Eileen Donaghy
Hugo Duncan 
Foster and Allen (on The Ultimate Collection, 2014)
Finbar Furey
Anthony Kearns
Josef Locke
Hank Locklin
Johnny McEvoy
Daniel O'Donnell
Finbar Wright

References

1973 songs
Irish songs